Stokesiidae is a family of ciliates in the order Peniculida.

References

 Stokesiidae on www.taxonomy.nl

 
Ciliate families